A floating building is a building unit with a flotation system at its base, to allow it to float on water.  It is common to define such a building as being "permanently moored" and not usable in navigation.  Floating buildings are usually towed into location by another ship and are unable to move under their own power.

Floating buildings have environmental benefits such as unsusceptibility to changes in sea level, and minimisation of disturbance to the ecology of the harbour or seabed.  They can be built off-site and then towed into location, minimising disturbance to the build site.  If the building is decommissioned, it can be relocated elsewhere.

See also
Very large floating structure

References

External links
The Floating Architecture of Rotterdam, Holland

Building